John Roe (7 January 193820 February 1996) was a Scottish footballer whose career as a full-back extended from 1959 (Berwick Rangers) to 1964 (St Johnstone).

A native of Broxburn, John Roe began his career as a trialist for Berwick Rangers, playing once in the 1957–58 season before moving south to Colchester United. The full-back played just twice for them before returning to Scotland, joining Dundee United in 1960. Despite staying at Tannadice for three seasons, Roe played in only eight league matches and made the short journey to Perth to join St Johnstone. Here, Roe played eleven league games during the 1963–64 season before retiring from football to join the police force.

Roe died in 1996.

References

External links

Berwick Rangers F.C. players
Colchester United F.C. players
Dundee United F.C. players
St Johnstone F.C. players
Scottish Football League players
Scottish footballers
Sportspeople from Broxburn, West Lothian
Footballers from West Lothian
1938 births
1996 deaths
Association football fullbacks